Joe Jackson Gibbs (born November 25, 1940)  is an American auto racing team owner and former professional football coach. In football, he was head coach for the Washington Redskins of the National Football League (NFL) from 1981 to 1992, and again from 2004 to 2007. During his first stint with the Redskins, he led them to eight playoff appearances, four NFC Championship titles, and three Super Bowl titles over 12 seasons. Gibbs is the only head coach to have won Super Bowls with three different starting quarterbacks. Gibbs is widely regarded as one of the greatest coaches in NFL history.

After retiring at the end of the 1992 season, he switched focus to NASCAR, forming the team Joe Gibbs Racing, which has since won five NASCAR Cup Series championships. In 2004, Gibbs came out of retirement to rejoin the Redskins as head coach, staying with them until 2007 when he again retired following the season's end. Gibbs was inducted into the Pro Football Hall of Fame in 1996, as well as being named to the NFL 100 All-Time Team. Gibbs was also inducted into the NASCAR Hall of Fame in 2020, making him the only person to be a member of both.

Early career
Born in Mocksville, North Carolina, Gibbs is the oldest of two sons of Jackson Cephus Gibbs (1916–1989) and Winnie Era Blalock (1915–2000).  Gibbs graduated from Santa Fe High School in 1959, where he was the star quarterback. Gibbs attended Cerritos Junior College and then San Diego State University (SDSU), coached by Don Coryell. Gibbs graduated from SDSU in 1964 and earned a master's degree in 1966.

Gibbs began his career with a stint as offensive line coach at San Diego State under Coryell (1964–1966). He held the same position under Bill Peterson at Florida State (1967–1968) before serving under John McKay at Southern California (1969–1970) and Frank Broyles at Arkansas (1971–1972). Gibbs then advanced to the National Football League, hired as the offensive backfield coach for the St. Louis Cardinals (1973–1977) by head coach Don Coryell. After a season as offensive coordinator for the Tampa Bay Buccaneers (1978) under McKay, Gibbs rejoined Coryell with the San Diego Chargers (1979–1980).

Advocating for African American Quarterbacks in the NFL
While in Tampa, Gibbs developed the reputation as a leading pioneer for championing African-American quarterbacks in the NFL, which was considered extremely controversial at the time. After thoroughly studying Matt Cavanaugh, who led Pitt to a national championship, Guy Benjamin, an All-American from Stanford University, and Doug Williams from Grambling State University, Gibbs rated Williams as the best professional prospect, and informed head coach McKay that Williams would be "hands down and without question" the best quarterback in the 1978 NFL Draft. According to Tony Dungy, “People don’t realize that Joe Gibbs changed the face of the NFL by having the courage to say, in a Southern town at that time, that Doug Williams is the guy we should take. When Tampa drafted Doug, it shocked the whole country to take this unknown from Grambling over those star players from Pitt and Stanford. But that was Joe Gibbs. He was looking for the best player possible." With the recommendation of Gibbs, Tampa Bay selected Williams, and became the first African-American drafted in the first round to play quarterback.

In his book Rise of the Black QB, author Jason Reid cited an incident in the 1978 Tampa Bay training camp, in which quarterbacks coach Bill Nelsen began berating Williams in what was described as going beyond coaching and becoming a personal attack. Gibbs, who was at the opposite end of the field, sprinted over to Nelsen and confronted him. "I think Coach Gibbs knew that it wasn't a matter of being coached hard," recalled Williams. "I mean, I played for Eddie Robinson at Grambling, so he knew I could handle that. But he (Gibbs) immediately sensed that something else was going on." Just a position coach at the time, Gibbs, who was at the opposite end of the field, sprinted over to Nelsen and confronted him. Gibbs threw his clipboard down, pointed his finger in Nelsen's face and said, "Don't you ever talk to him like that again! Is that clear?" According to Williams, Nelsen never confonted Williams in that manner again.

The Architect of Air Coryell
As the offensive coordinator for San Diego, Gibbs spearheaded the highly successful "Air Coryell" offense. Using a sophisticated passing attack, the Chargers and quarterback Dan Fouts set multiple offensive records during Gibbs' two seasons there. Remarkably, the Chargers averaged more than 400 yards of offense per game during their 1980 season. After 17 years of coaching as an assistant, the Washington Redskins offered Gibbs their head coaching position.

Washington Redskins (1981–1992)
After firing then-head coach Jack Pardee, Redskins owner Jack Kent Cooke was on the lookout for candidates. When general manager Bobby Beathard pointed out the 40-year-old San Diego assistant coach, Cooke, who had a keen eye for spotting leadership and an ability to teach (he also hired Jerry West and Sparky Anderson to their first managerial/executive  jobs), saw Gibbs' potential during an interview and hired him.

Gibbs' first season with the Redskins started inauspiciously when the team lost their first five games. Cooke famously expressed confidence in Gibbs, declaring that the team would finish 8-8. The losses and Cooke's confidence served as a catalyst, and the newly motivated team improved and reached an even 8–8 record in 1981.

Gibbs' second season with the Redskins, which was shortened by a players strike, saw them defeat the Miami Dolphins 27–17 in Super Bowl XVII. In 1983, Gibbs' success continued with a 14–2 regular-season record and a win against the Los Angeles Rams 51–7 at home, in the divisional round of the playoffs. The Redskins once again won an NFC Championship, defeating the San Francisco 49ers 24–21 on a last-second field goal, advancing to Super Bowl XVIII. The Redskins were installed as a 2-point favorite by Nevada books going into the game, but were soundly defeated by the Los Angeles Raiders 38–9.

The 1984 Redskins won the NFC East with an 11–5 record and hosted a home playoff game against the Chicago Bears but lost 23–19.

Gibbs coached the 1985 Redskins to a 10–6 regular-season record and barely missed the playoffs. During the season Joe Theismann broke his leg during a Monday Night Football game against the New York Giants, but the Redskins still won the game with Jay Schroeder at quarterback.

In 1986, Gibbs coached the team to a 12–4 regular-season record and defeated the Los Angeles Rams 19–7 in the wild card playoffs, then upset the defending champion Chicago Bears 27–13 in the divisional round, on the road, to get back to the NFC Championship game against the New York Giants. The Giants would win 17–0. It was to be Gibbs' only NFC championship game loss.

The 1987 Redskins made the playoffs and again defeated the Chicago Bears 21–17 on the road in the divisional round, then beat the Minnesota Vikings 17–10 at home in the NFC Championship Game, then at Super Bowl XXII, they rode the arm of quarterback Doug Williams to blow out the Denver Broncos 42–10.

Four years later, the Redskins won their first 11 games before finishing the season 14–2, and cruised through the playoffs with home victories over the Atlanta Falcons (24–7) and Detroit Lions (41–10). In Super Bowl XXVI, the Redskins were up 24–0 on the Buffalo Bills just 16 seconds into the third quarter, and 37–10 with over 11 minutes to go when Gibbs pulled most of his starters.  The Bills would score two cosmetic touchdowns for a final score of 37–24.  The victory gave Gibbs and the team their third Super Bowl title.

Gibbs returned for the 1992 regular season to defend the Redskins' Super Bowl crown from the previous year. The Redskins finished with a lesser record at 9–7 and third place in the NFC East. They needed a bit of help to make the playoffs and they got it after a loss by the Green Bay Packers got them in as the last Wild Card entry. In the Wild Card round, the Redskins defeated the Minnesota Vikings on the road, by the score of 24–7, however they would fall in the Divisional Round to the San Francisco 49ers in a road game by the score of 20–13, ending the Redskins' hopes of retaining their Super Bowl crown. Two months after Super Bowl XXVII, Gibbs retired on March 5, 1993, surprising many in the organization and around the league. Center Jeff Bostic called it "probably the biggest shock I've gotten in my life." A notorious workaholic, he had begun to suffer health problems, and he cited a desire to spend more time with his family.

From 1994 to 1997, Gibbs served as a color analyst on NBC Sports' NFL pregame show.

In 1996, Gibbs was enshrined in the Pro Football Hall of Fame. He was one of the winningest coaches in the NFL, with a record of 124–60, and a post-season record of 16–5. His combined winning percentage of .683 was third all-time (behind Vince Lombardi and John Madden). In his 12 seasons so far, the Redskins won 4 NFC East titles, reached the playoffs 8 times, and finished with a losing record only one season (7–9 in 1988). Gibbs is the only NFL coach to win three Super Bowls with three different starting quarterbacks and three different starting running backs.

Style of play
Although Gibbs helped craft a passing-oriented attack during his time in San Diego, his Redskins teams incorporated a smash-mouth, rushing-oriented attack called the counter trey. By building a strong offensive line (known as "The Hogs") Gibbs was able to control the line of scrimmage, allowing workhorse running backs John Riggins, George Rogers, and Earnest Byner to power the ground game. Gibbs added a deep passing attack which complemented the ground game, utilizing agile receivers such as Art Monk, Gary Clark, and Ricky Sanders. Gibbs' offense was aided by aggressive defensive units under the direction of defensive coordinator Richie Petitbon.

Gibbs' system was robust enough to be successful without a Hall-of-Fame-caliber quarterback at the helm. The Redskins' Super Bowl victories were won featuring Joe Theismann, Doug Williams, and Mark Rypien. Gibbs is credited with inventing the H-back set, typically by use of a smaller tight end in the backfield. Gibbs was also credited for creating the Trips formation: stacking three wide receivers to one side. He is one of few coaches that utilized the H-back position prominently in his offense. Gibbs' offenses were known for their extensive number of formations, as well as shifts and motions.

Joe Gibbs Racing (1992–present)

Gibbs created his NASCAR team, Joe Gibbs Racing in 1992, a year before he first retired from the NFL. The first driver for his team was Dale Jarrett (1992–1994), with the sponsor Interstate Batteries, and the number 18. His son, J. D. Gibbs, was the president of Joe Gibbs Racing and oversaw daily operations of each of the teams since his father's return to the NFL.

The team currently fields four cars in the NASCAR Cup Series and two in the NASCAR Xfinity Series.

NASCAR

Cup Series teams
 No. 11 Denny Hamlin
 No. 19 Martin Truex Jr.
 No. 20 Christopher Bell
 No. 54 (formerly the No. 18) Ty Gibbs

Xfinity Series team
 No. 18 Sammy Smith 
 No. 20 John Hunter Nemechek

NASCAR championships
 2000 – Bobby Labonte, No. 18 Interstate Batteries Pontiac, Winston Cup Series
 2002 – Tony Stewart, No. 20 Home Depot Pontiac, Winston Cup Series
 2005 – Tony Stewart, No. 20 Home Depot Chevrolet, Nextel Cup Series
 2007 – Joey Logano, No. 20 Joe Gibbs Driven Racing Oil Chevrolet, Busch East Series
 2009 – Kyle Busch, No. 18 Z-Line Toyota, Nationwide Series
 2015 – Kyle Busch, No. 18 M&M's Toyota, Sprint Cup Series
 2016 – Daniel Suárez, No. 19 Arris Toyota, Xfinity Series
 2019 – Kyle Busch, No. 18 M&M's Toyota, Monster Energy Cup Series
 2021 - Daniel Hemric, No. 18 Poppy Bank Toyota, Xfinity Series
 2022 - Ty Gibbs , No. 54 Monster Energy Toyota, Xfinty Series

NHRA
Beginning in 1995, Gibbs fielded three cars in the NHRA, one, in each professional category:
 the Funny Car, driven by Cruz Pedregon
 the Top Fuel dragster, driven by Cory McClenathan
 the Pro Stock Firebird, driven by Jim Yates
Yates would bring home 2 NHRA Winston Pro Stock Championships in 1996 and 1997. McDonald's was the primary sponsor on all three cars from 1995 to 1997. In 1998 Cruz Pedregon would be sponsored by Interstate Batteries and Jim Yates by SplitFire.

Pedregon won Gibbs' first NHRA National Event as a team owner at the 1995 NHRA Chief Auto Parts Winternationals. He would couple that with a victory at the '95 NHRA U.S. Nationals, third for Pedregon in four years at the U.S. Nationals. Pedregon continued to race for Gibbs until mid-season (Englishtown, New Jersey) in 1999. Ending with a final-round appearance, Pedregon left to race on his own, and was replaced by Tommy Johnson Jr. would win his first Fuel Funny Car win with Gibbs at the '99 NHRA Keystone Nationals and would go to the next two final rounds, scoring another victory in the process. It was announced that after the '99 season, Gibbs team would be reduced to a two-car team, and the Funny Car team was parked from then on.

McClenathan finished second in NHRA Winston Top Fuel points in both 1997 and 1998 with Gibbs. In 1997, McClenathan went on a hot streak, sweeping the famed Western Swing (Denver, Sonoma, Seattle) and a total four wins in a row, 5 in 6 races since Denver, including a final round at the U.S. Nationals in '97. He also took Gibbs' MBNA Top Fuel Dragster to a $200,000 payday, winning the 2000 NHRA Winston No-Bull Showdown, pitting Top Fuel Dragsters against Funny Cars in a 24 car shootout.

Gibbs announced that he would focus solely on his NASCAR teams following the 2000 season, ending the six-year-long relationship with NHRA.

Motocross
In 2008, Gibbs branched out into motorcycle racing, forming the JGRMX team competing in the AMA motocross and supercross championships. The team is based in Huntersville, North Carolina. The team was managed by Gibbs' son Coy Gibbs until his untimely death in November 2022.

Second stint with Redskins (2004–2007)

Throughout his retirement, many NFL owners approached Gibbs hoping to lure him out of retirement, but to no avail. Some owners even offered to move his entire NASCAR racing team to their team's city if he came back. The only team he seriously considered coming back for was the Carolina Panthers when they first joined the NFL as an expansion in 1995. However, he did not believe he would be able to manage his time between his race team and coaching. In 1999, he was part of a group that was trying to buy the Redskins but ultimately failed. In 2002, Gibbs and a small group of investors bought five percent of the Atlanta Falcons from owner Arthur Blank for $27 million. It wasn't until late 2003 when Gibbs really started to catch the football fever again. Blank and his general manager, Rich McKay moved quickly to interview him for the Falcons' vacant head coaching position due to the firing of Dan Reeves.

In January 2004, Gibbs accepted an offer from Redskins owner Daniel Snyder to return as the team's head coach. At his press conference, Gibbs stated that even though he enjoyed NASCAR, he had also missed coaching in the NFL. Gibbs left his racing team in the hands of his eldest son, J.D., while his other son, Coy, joined him as an assistant with the Redskins. Many coaches from his previous tenure with the team returned with Gibbs as well, including offensive line coach/assistant head coach Joe Bugel, offensive coordinator Don Breaux, quarterbacks coach Jack Burns, and tight ends coach Rennie Simmons. Gibbs also hired former Buffalo Bills head coach Gregg Williams to join the team to run the defense and hired one of his former running backs, Earnest Byner, to serve as running backs coach.

In 2004, Gibbs had what was, up to that point, the worst season of his career with a 6-10 finish. However, the team did finish the season on a high note with a 21–18 victory over playoff-bound Minnesota. The defense also finished the season ranked third in yards allowed. Hoping to improve on the previous season's dismal passing attack, Gibbs added former Jacksonville Jaguars offensive coordinator Bill Musgrave as his quarterbacks coach.  Having coached new Redskins quarterback Mark Brunell when they both were in Jacksonville, they easily formed a rapport. Musgrave's input allowed the Redskins to add a few new wrinkles to their playbook. For the first time under Gibbs, the Redskins offense utilized the shotgun formation. In the Wild Card playoff game, Gibbs led his team to a 17–10 victory over the Tampa Bay Buccaneers, to whom the Redskins suffered a 36–35 defeat earlier in the year. In the next round of the playoffs, however, the Redskins could not replicate their early-season victory over the Super Bowl-bound Seattle Seahawks, and lost to the eventual NFC Champion by the score of 20–10.

During the 2006 offseason, Gibbs hired Kansas City Chiefs' offensive coordinator Al Saunders to be associate head coach. Saunders came from a similar background as Gibbs, as both learned under Don Coryell. He took over for Gibbs as the team's primary play-caller upon joining the Redskins. This allowed Gibbs to focus more on his role as head coach and CEO and devote more time to personnel matters, defense, and special teams. Gibbs also added former Buffalo Bills defensive coordinator Jerry Gray to his staff as secondary/cornerbacks coach.

The Redskins finished 5–11 in 2006, the team's worst regular-season record under him. The following season the team suffered a tragedy when free safety Sean Taylor was shot in his home during a home robbery in November 2007 and died in the hospital a day later. However, the Redskins still qualified for the playoffs following the completion of a 9–7 regular season before being defeated by the NFC West division champions Seattle Seahawks in the first round. Gibbs retired as head coach and president in January 2008, citing family obligations. During Gibbs' four-year return to the Redskins, the team qualified for the playoffs twice, once more than it qualified for the playoffs during his 11-year absence. He was succeeded as head coach by Jim Zorn.

Head coaching record

Personal life
Gibbs currently resides in Charlotte, North Carolina, with his wife, the former Patricia Escobar. Pat Escobar Gibbs is of Mexican American descent. They had two sons, J. D. Gibbs and Coy Gibbs, and eight grandchildren. J. D. and his wife, Melissa, had four sons: Jackson, Miller, Jason, and Taylor. Coy Gibbs and wife Heather have three sons Ty, Case, Jet, and daughter Elle. In January 2007, Gibbs revealed that Taylor was diagnosed with leukemia, adding that his grandson had undergone surgery and received chemotherapy treatments. Gibbs is a devout Christian. His son J.D. died on January 11, 2019, after a long battle with neurological brain disease diagnosed in 2015, while his other son, Coy, died in his sleep on November 5, 2022. His grandsons Jackson and Ty both work for his team. Jackson played College football at UCLA and Appalachian State. Jackson is currently a pit crew member for Christopher Bell in the NASCAR Cup Series. Ty drives the No. 54 in the NASCAR Cup Series for JGR. Ty won the 2021 ARCA Menards Series championship and the 2022 NASCAR Xfinity Series championship.

Politics
On September 5, 2008, Gibbs addressed the 2008 Republican National Convention, during which he offered his support for John McCain and his hope that the McCain-Palin ticket would lead to a 'spiritual awakening' in the United States. Gibbs has long been open about his Christian faith, but notoriously reserved about articulating his political positions, because, as the old Washington joke goes, "The Redskins are the only thing that unites the town." As one of the most sought after A-List figures in Washington social circles for over a quarter-century (and even being referred to as "the most popular man in Washington" by the Washington Post), Gibbs admitted being uneasy addressing the convention, stating that it was "a little awkward to put on a partisan hat."

Awards and honors
NFL
 Three-time Super Bowl champion (1982, 1987, 1991)
 Two-time NFL Coach of the Year (1982, 1983)
 NFL 100 All-Time Team

NASCAR
 Five-time NASCAR Cup Series champion (as owner of Joe Gibbs Racing)
 Two-time NASCAR Xfinity Series champion (as owner of Joe Gibbs Racing)

Halls of Fame
 Pro Football Hall of Fame (class of 1996)
 Washington Ring of Fame
 NASCAR Hall of Fame inductee (class of 2020)

State/local
 Coach Gibbs Drive - a street leading to Washington's practice facility in Ashburn, Virginia

Writing career
In 1992, Gibbs co-authored Joe Gibbs: Fourth and One, and in 2003, he co-authored Racing to Win. The books resemble a business and life how-to book and motivational guide as he discusses his successes and mistakes in his career, offering the lessons he learned as tips to the readers. In 2009, Gibbs wrote the book Game Plan for Life which discusses his life in football; how his religious faith can help others and outside of sports, as well as key topics that are important to people trying to lead a contemporary Christian lifestyle.

See also
 List of National Football League head coaches with 50 wins
 List of members of the NASCAR Hall of Fame
 Joe Gibbs Racing

References

External links

 Joe Gibbs Racing
 
 

1940 births
Living people
American football tight ends
American motivational writers
Arkansas Razorbacks football coaches
Atlanta Falcons owners
Cerritos Falcons football players
College football announcers
Florida State Seminoles football coaches
Motorcycle racing team owners
NASCAR team owners
National Football League announcers
San Diego Chargers coaches
San Diego State Aztecs football coaches
San Diego State Aztecs football players
St. Louis Cardinals (football) coaches
Tampa Bay Buccaneers coaches
USC Trojans football coaches
Washington Redskins head coaches
Pro Football Hall of Fame inductees
People from Buncombe County, North Carolina
Sportspeople from Los Angeles County, California
People from Loudoun County, Virginia
Players of American football from California
20th-century American non-fiction writers
21st-century American non-fiction writers
20th-century American male writers
Super Bowl-winning head coaches
People from Mocksville, North Carolina
American male non-fiction writers
21st-century American male writers
NASCAR Hall of Fame inductees